Apesokari (Greek: Απεσωκάρι) is the archaeological site of an ancient Minoan cemetery.  It is also a modern village with a population of 103 (2011) and is built at 155 m above sea level.  It is in the municipality of Gortyna in the south of Heraklion regional unit, Greece.

Population

Archaeology
Apesokari was first excavated during World War II. In this first Excavation, a small tholos tomb, a cult room and an outdoor altar were excavated.  
The smallest Tholos tomb is at the southwest region of Apesokri village at the foot of the central Asterousia mountains.
Tholos Tomb A was found partially looted by Tomb robbers but a few stone vessels and clay pots were restored and collected. 
Excavated by an Austrian archaeologist, sent on a mission to protect cultural monuments, for the "Art Protection Unit" of Wehrmacht in the summer of 1942. The tombs connected the Apesokari people with their ancestors and allowed them to keep connection with the dead. Smashed vessels and remnants of cups reflect the tribes value of unity and community. The rituals at Apesokari's tombs reveal toasting and banquets at burial, a popular Mycenean tradition.

Minoan Tombs 
The tomb is notable for the fact that burials did not only take place inside the tholos tomb, but also took place in some of the outer rooms which join the tholos tomb as well. It also had a cult room, most likely a pillar crypt, since it had a wooden pillar on a stone base. A small bench altar was built in a niche to the right of the entrance. A cult image, formed from natural rock, was found on this altar. There was also a large altar outside, surrounded by a paved area.
The Minoan tribes that occupied Crete built and used the Tholos Tombs. The structure of their tombs indicated that the culture was decentralized with no powerful landlords or authority during 2600B.C – 2000B.C.  The circular setting of the Tholos tombs placed the dead in non-hierarchical patterns. Most burial tombs built around the same time frame were rectangular. The tribes would often replace old bones and rebury them outside of the Tholos tomb in order to lay the freshly dead to rest.
Ruins of Palaces built after the Tholos Tombs indicate an authoritative figure was introduced to the tribe. Palace structures were placed as the center of the main community, implying that the village had some form of bureaucracy. The palaces in Crete were massively destroyed by an unknown source around 1700 B.C. Speculators believe the palaces were destroyed by either a powerful earthquake or a massive eruption of the Thera Volcano. Some archaeologists believe that outside invaders could have destroyed the palaces. The palaces were rebuilt into more extravagant structures along with above ground tombs during the height Minoan Crete Civilization.

See also

List of settlements in the Heraklion regional unit

References

 Swindale, Ian http://www.minoancrete.com/apesokari.htm Retrieved 11 February 2006

External links
 http://www.minoancrete.com/apesokari.htm (Excellent Photographs)
Apesokari at the GTP Travel Pages

Minoan sites in Crete
Ancient cemeteries in Greece
Populated places in Heraklion (regional unit)